"Deuce" is a song by the American hard rock band Kiss, written by bassist and vocalist Gene Simmons. The song appeared on Kiss' eponymous 1974 debut album. In addition to being one of the band's most popular and most-covered songs, "Deuce" is a traditional concert opener. The song has appeared on many Kiss live and compilation albums.

Background
According to Gene Simmons, he simply copied the bassline of the Rolling Stones' "Bitch" and played it more or less backwards. "I wrote 'Deuce' on the bass," he said, "so the guitars ended up shadowing the bass line or variations of it in different octaves".

The entire song was written nearly linearly; the riff came first, then the bridge, then finally the chorus. While uncredited, Paul Stanley provided the lightly phased intro riff, inspired by the Raspberries' "Go All the Way". "It's an integral part of the song," he observed, "but should I get credit for that? I don't think so".

"Deuce" also has special significance for Ace Frehley, as it was the first song he ever played with Kiss. "When I auditioned for Kiss", recalled Frehley, "they said, 'We're going to play you a song for you to listen to, and then try playing along — it's in the key of 'A'. They played ["Deuce"] as a three-piece. I thought, 'That's easy enough,' so I got up and wailed for four minutes playing lead work over it". Frehley has also stated that Deuce is his favorite Kiss song

Gene Simmons stated in reference to the song: "Lyrically, I had no idea what I was talking about. Sometimes stuff means a lot, sometimes it means nothing".

On July 28, 2009, a live version was released (along with live versions of "100,000 Years" and "Parasite") in the Kiss 01 track pack for Rock Band 2.

Live performances
The song was performed during the first Kiss tours, mostly as the opener. It was dropped from the setlist for the Rock and Roll Over Tour and was not performed regularly in the USA until the Hot in the Shade Tour in 1990. After 1976, it was not played again until a show in Evansville, Indiana in January 1978. It was played in some one-off shows in the US in 1988 as well as the European Crazy Nights Tour in 1988. Simmons has said that during the band's first tours, after they did the usual setlist and encore, they did not have any more songs to play so they played "Deuce" again.

Reception
"Deuce" is widely considered one of Kiss's best songs. In 2014, Paste ranked the song number one on their list of the 20 greatest Kiss songs, and in 2019, Louder Sound ranked the song number two on their list of the 40 greatest Kiss songs.

Appearances
"Deuce" has appeared on the following Kiss albums:
Kiss – studio version
Alive! – live version
The Originals – studio version
Double Platinum – studio version
Smashes, Thrashes & Hits – remixed studio version
Kiss My Ass: Classic Kiss Regrooved - recorded by Lenny Kravitz
Greatest Kiss – studio version
The Box Set – demo version
The Very Best of Kiss – studio version
Kiss Symphony: Alive IV – live version
The Best of Kiss: The Millennium Collection – studio version
Kiss Instant Live – live version
Gold – studio version
Kiss Chronicles: 3 Classic Albums – studio version
Kiss Alive! 1975–2000 – Alive! version
Kiss Alive 35 – live version
Ikons – studio version
Jigoku-Retsuden – rerecorded version
Kiss Sonic Boom Over Europe – live version
Ace Frehley, 12 Picks – live version

Personnel

Kiss, Alive! and Alive! The Millennium Concert personnel
Gene Simmons – bass guitar, lead vocals
Paul Stanley – rhythm guitar, backing vocals
Peter Criss – drums
Ace Frehley – lead guitar

Alive III personnel
Gene Simmons – bass guitar, lead vocals
Paul Stanley – rhythm guitar, backing vocals
Eric Singer – drums
Bruce Kulick – lead guitar

Kiss Symphony: Alive IV personnel
Gene Simmons – bass guitar, lead vocals
Paul Stanley – rhythm guitar, backing vocals
Peter Criss – drums
Tommy Thayer – lead guitar

Kiss Instant Live, Kiss Alive 35, Kiss Sonic Boom Over Europe and Jigoku-Retsuden personnel
Gene Simmons – bass guitar, lead vocals
Paul Stanley – rhythm guitar, backing vocals
Eric Singer – drums
Tommy Thayer – lead guitar

In popular culture

A tribute nod to the "worth a deuce" lyric and signature guitar riff is briefly featured on the 1976 single "Muff Divin'" by Indiana punk band The Gizmos.

References

External links
"Deuce" at SongFacts.com

Kiss (band) songs
1974 songs
Songs written by Gene Simmons